Panasonic Lumix DMC-LZ20 is a digital camera by Panasonic Lumix from the year 2012. The highest-resolution pictures it records is 16.1 megapixels, through its 25mm Wide-Angle Lens.

Property
25mm Wide Angle (25mm-525mm)
21x Optical Zoom
16 Megapixel Sensor
3" LCD Display

References

External links
DMC-LZ20K on shop.panasonic.com
Panasonic Lumix DMC-LZ20 review

Bridge digital cameras
LZ20